Miracle, Kentucky, may refer to:

 Miracle, Bell County, Kentucky, an unincorporated community
 Miracle, Lincoln County, Kentucky, an unincorporated community